My Own Mag was an independent publication, or zine, published by Jeff Nuttall from 1960 to 1967.

The influential, but rather unknown, publication is in retrospect most heralded for being a platform for William S. Burroughs experimental prose of the sixties, at a time when Burroughs had problems being published elsewhere.

Having gained little notoriety in larger circles, the publications have been mostly forgotten about, however, lately the William Burroughs website Reality Studio has recently put out a sample, containing several full versions of several of the zines.

References

Magazines established in 1960
Magazines disestablished in 1967
William S. Burroughs
Zines
Defunct literary magazines published in the United States
Independent magazines